Bibliothèques Sans Frontières (BSF), known as Libraries Without Borders (LWB) in English, is a charitable organisation based in France that provides access to information and education for those who need it most, whether refugees in humanitarian crises or under-resourced communities in the developed world. Founded in 2007, the organization distributes books, develops innovative technologies (including the Ideas Box), creates customized programs, and builds digital learning platforms in more than 50 countries, including Colombia, Cameroon, Bangladesh, France, and the United States.  The U.S. branch, opened in 2008, is based in Washington, D.C., and listed as a non profit 501(c) organization under U.S. law.  The organization received the Library of Congress' International Literacy Award in 2016.

History
French historian Patrick Weil founded Bibliothèques Sans Frontières in January 2007 assisted by Jérémy Lachal. Its early focus was to strengthen and reinforce libraries by providing books and training for librarians. Following the 2010 earthquake in Haiti, BSF broadened its efforts to include support for culture and education during humanitarian emergencies. After building libraries in relief camps throughout Haiti, Bibliothèques Sans Frontières developed best practices to promoting access to information and cultural resources in post-disaster contexts.

In 2013, BSF partnered with Philippe Starck to design a kit that would make it easier to set up libraries in disaster zones and areas affected by conflict. Thus was born the Ideas Box, a mobile, pop-up library equipped with books, e-readers, tablets, laptops, cameras, a digital library, and web-based content, including Wikipedia and Khan Academy videos. The Ideas Box breaks down into tables and chairs, and provides its own internet access and energy source. It has been used in a variety of contexts, including refugee and IDP camps, demobilization zones, inner cities, rural areas, and anywhere that people are without access to information and resources for learning.

Objectives and Activities
Bibliothèques Sans Frontières' operations encompass three principal axes of intervention.

Humanitarian Aid and Peace-Building 
The first intervention of Bibliothèques Sans Frontières in an emergency humanitarian context was during the natural catastrophes in Haiti in 2010.  The principal objective of the organization is to allow the communities made vulnerable by natural catastrophes to stay in contact with the rest of the world, to strengthen education, and to provide psycho-social support.

In the same spirit, Bibliothèques Sans Frontières intervenes in refugee situations around the world; thus following the Syrian crisis of 2012, BSF was active  in Germany, Italy, and Greece, but also Jordan, Iraq, and Lebanon. The organization is also present in the African Great Lakes region, which has witnessed years of bloody conflicts. BSF has worked in Colombia following the armed conflict of the state and the Revolutionary Armed Forces of Colombia (FARC). In this post-conflict situation, the organization in partnership with the government of Colombia, the Colombian Ministry of Culture and the National Libraries of Colombia, installed 20 mobile libraries in demobilization camps.

Education and Tools for Cultural Expression 
The second principal axis of intervention includes both education and resources for cultural creation. Bibliothèques Sans Frontières works, in France as around the world, to reduce inequality in several contexts. BSF claims to offer access to cultural resources, to education, and also to information. This work is done in opening real and virtual libraries around the world. In so doing, the libraries become fundamental tools in this reduction of inequality, and also serve in the development of democracy and citizenship.

Social Entrepreneurship 
Bibliothèques Sans Frontières’ third and final axis of intervention concerns the social transformation of communities in structurally precarious situations and the development of social entrepreneurship. The goals of these interventions are to rethink libraries such that they become financially sustainable and socially meaningful (supporting shared values, proposing activities for communities in unfavorable conditions, etc.). Beyond that, BSF seeks to rethink the vision of the profession of librarian. The organization offers training for young librarians.

Tools and Programs 
To carry out its projects, Bibliothèques Sans Frontières uses different technologies, tools, and programs including the Ideas Box, the Ideas Cube (formerly the Koombook), the Digital Traveller’s program, as well as the online learning platform, Khan Academy.

The Ideas Box 
The Ideas Box is a mobile, autonomous, and durable media center in a kit created in 2013 by BSF with the designer Philippe Starck and with the support of the United Nations High Commission for Refugees that provides educational and cultural resources, both physical and digital, to communities in need.  The Ideas Box is used in humanitarian and post-conflict situations to provide information and education, and delivers access and resources to underserved communities in industrialized countries. To date, BSF has run 140 Ideas Box programs in 23 countries, with more than a million total visits.

The Ideas Box contains four modules, beginning with an administrative one (yellow) that houses the network system (server, storage, and wi-fi signal) as well as an electrical system (battery, inverter). The second module is digital and includes e-readers, HD cameras, laptops, and more. The third is the cinema module that includes an HD TV and a projector.  Included in this module are pedagogic tools such as documentaries or learning resources developed for each context, as well as films of all kinds for children and adults. Finally, the fourth  module is a library (orange) with up to 300 books. These four modules come with stools and two big tables that use the Box itself.

BSF uses the Ideas Box in places touched by natural disasters or armed conflicts, including Burundi, but also among under-privileged and marginalized communities in the developed world. The provide in the local language tools that permit individuals and communities to better reconstruct themselves. BSF runs its programs in close collaboration with operational partners who help select the contents of each Ideas Box, customizing its contents to fit the occasion.  After a period of one year, BSF turns over possession and operation of the Ideas Box to local organizations.

Kajou 
In 2018 BSF created Kajou, a digital application that gives access to a large library of contents through an SD card. The initiative is designed for Sub-Saharan African populations who are disconnected from the internet.

Digital Travelers 
Digital Travelers (Les Voyageurs du numérique) is a program that provides to children and adults free workshops on computer literacy. These workshops aim to raise awareness about digital issues and teach computer competency. Previously called Code Travelers (Voyageurs du code) and focused on programming, the Digital Travelers today adheres to the open source movement..

Governance

President and Director General 
Patrick Weil has been president of the association since its creation in 2007.  Jérémy Lachal, the co-founder, was Secretary General until becoming Director General in February 2016.

Board of Directors 
The board of BSF has an executive and deliberative role. It meets several times a year.  In France, the board is composed of 19 members:  Patrick Weil, Olivier Bassuet, Peter Sahlins, Véronique Brachet, Geneviève Brisac, Ghislaine Hudson, Jean-Baptiste Soufron, Julien Serignac, Constance Rivière, Farid Benlagha, Arnaud Delalande, Christian Connan, Mary Fleming, Antoine Boulay, Thierry Marembert, Silvère Mercier, Eros Sana, Anna Soravito, and Frédéric Régent. The 14 members. of the US board include Patrick Weil, Peter Sahlins, Noorain Khan, Katherine Reisner, Ramona Naddaff and Mark Cramer.

National Member Associations of the BSF Network

France 
The French association is the leader of the Bibliothèques Sans Frontières network, with its seat in Montreuil (just outside Paris), and its book collection center at  Épône in the Yvelines department. BSF France has regional bureaux in Marseille, Bordeaux, Lille, and Nancy.  Internationally, BSF has bureaux in Burundi, Bogotá (Colombia), Amman (Jordan), and Erbil (Irak).

United States 
The American association LWB US was established in 2008 and has its seat in Washington D.C. Its focus is on programming the U.S. and Puerto Rico among communities historically subject to discrimination. Aaron Greenberg is Executive Director of LWB US.

Belgium 
The Belgian association, BSF Belge, was founded in 2018 has its seat in Brussels.  Its focus is on strengthening educational activities, using among others the Khan Academy videos in French and its own Digital Travellers program. Dimitri Verboomen is Director of BSF Belge.

Finances 
Bibliothèques Sans Frontières has grown significantly in recent years, with an average budge of 7.8M euros over the three year period from 2016 to 2018, of which 6.4M euros come from private sources. Eight-three percent of funds are used for  social missions.  In 2018, 57% of these funds were for international cooperation (18% of these in multi-country missions, 11% in Europe outside of France, 5% in West Africa, 2% in Central Africa, 26% in North Africa and the Middle East, 9% in South America and Asia).  34% of funds allocated are for French programs, 5% for the BSF collections program, and 4% for research and public awareness.

Advocacy Campaigns

Book Donation 
Since 2007, BSF Depuis 2007, BSF partners with the retailer FNAC in France to collect donated books and makes them available those resources. The collected books are distributed to libraries in France or internationally or resold.

"Libraries: The Challenge for France" - 2017 
In the spring of 2017 BSF and the Association of French Libraries (Association de bibliothèquaires en France, ABF) called on candidates for the legislative elections to commit to supporting libraries.  Adhering to this charter, they promised to take measures to maintain and develop libraries if elected in their districts, to increase access and opening hours, to support the construction of libraries in zones where they were lacking, and to increase the allocated budgets of libraries including the hiring of qualified librarians. This communiqué included a petition signed by thousands of people including Éliette Abecassis, Christophe Deloire, Sara Yalda, Abd Al Malik, Geneviève Brisac, Laure Kermen-Lecuir, Valérie Lasserre Kiesow, Pierre Vesperini, Gérard Grunberg, Yerri Urban, Romain Dambre, Paul Egre, Nicole Caligaris, Vincent Chabault, Arnaud Delalande, Thomas Perroud, Laurent Joly, Ghislaine Hudson, Frédéric Barbier, Evelyne Bloch-Dano, Emmanuelle Saulnier-Cassia and Thomas Hochmann.

Open + the Libraries - 2014

In a campaign leading up to the 2014 municipal elections, BSF advocated for increased opening hours of libraries deemed ill-adapted for students, workers, teachers, and others. Bsf proposed to extend opening hours to Sunday afternoon and evening. Among the signatories of the proposition were Éliette Abecassis, Pierre Assouline, Olivier Barrot, Evelyne Bloch-Dano, Geneviève Brisac, Catherine Cusset, Dany Laferrière, Erik Orsenna, Bernard Pivot, Lilian Thuram, Emmanuel Todd, and Benjamin Stora.

"The Urgency of Reading"  - 2012 
The Urgency of Reading campaign sought to raise awareness, promote research, and change practices. This international appeal was opened to the public on 29 November 2012 and called for international organizations and states to consider a priority of humanitarian assistance the intellectual dimension of the human being in danger.  The appeal was notably addressed to the General Secretary of the United Nations, the General Director of UNESCO, and the European Commission.  The campaign opened an intense period of development and partnerships for BSF, and led to the development of new tools to diffuse learning and information in emergencies, including the Ideas Box.

Awards and honors
Bibliothèques Sans Frontières/Libraries Without Borders has received the following awards and honors:

 The Google Impact Challenge 2015
 WISE Accelerator 2015
Ashoka Prize 2015
La France s'engage prize 2015
IDEAS Prize 2015
Grand Prize for Culture, Louis D. Foundation (2015)
 The Library of Congress Literacy Award 2016
Clinton Global Initiative 2016
 Open Education Consortium's Creative Innovation Award 2017 
 UNHCR's Humanitarian Education Accelerator 2017 
Rodenberry Prize Fellowship 2019

References

External links
 

Charities based in France
Library-related organizations